= Queen Street Arts and Culture District =

Coordinates: 43.106623°N 79.066994°W

The Queen Street Arts and Culture District is the old downtown area of Niagara Falls, Ontario, Canada. The street is now populated with art galleries, restaurants, and performing spaces. Home to one of the Niagara Region's largest Festival, Springlicious.

== Art ==
The art galleries feature works from a number of well-known artists, including John Newby. Most of the galleries feature an inviting sitting area from which patrons can view the various pieces in the galleries.

== Performance venues ==
The once prominent Seneca theater has been rebuilt to its former glory with the help of the Trillium Foundation. The new Seneca theater presents live performances.
